Hof–Plauen Airport  is a regional airport serving Hof, a city in the German state of Bavaria.

Facilities

Airlines and destinations
There are currently no scheduled services to and from Hof–Plauen Airport. The last route was operated by Cirrus Airlines on behalf of Lufthansa to Frankfurt Airport and ceased in January 2012. Since then, there were only charter and business flights. In 2017 there were around 7000 departures and landings.
The airport and the runway is also used by BMW for testing new cars, mostly electric cars and autonomous driving.

See also
 Transport in Germany
 List of airports in Germany

References

External links

 Official website
 
 

Airport Hof-Plauen
Plauen
Buildings and structures in Bavaria
Hof